Phantom Anthem is the eighth studio album by American metalcore band August Burns Red. It was released on October 6, 2017, through Fearless Records and was produced by Carson Slovak and Grant McFarland. The album peaked at No. 19 on the Billboard 200, selling 19,000 equivalent album units (17,000 in traditional sales) in its first week.

Reception

Critical reception 

Metacritic, with four ratings from selected critics, assigns a score of 82 out of 100, giving the album universal acclaim. James Christopher Monger, from AllMusic, gives the album 4/5 stars, and stated that Phantom Anthem delivers "a balanced, brutal, and almost relentlessly efficient 11-track set that deftly utilizes every inch of sonic space to its advantage". NewNoiseMagazine offers some additional positive feedback, praised the newest album, stating "It's true, classic metalcore, with sometimes lightning fast feeling guitar work underlying harsh vocals. There are not really any clean vocals on this release, but that's not a drawback...it doesn't push the genre – other bands can do that – instead, it just perfects it."

Accolades 
August Burns Red received a Grammy nomination for their song "Invisible Enemy" under the "Best Metal Performance" category.

Track listing

Personnel
August Burns Red
 Jake Luhrs – lead vocals
 JB Brubaker – lead guitar
 Brent Rambler – rhythm guitar
 Dustin Davidson – bass guitar, backing vocals
 Matt Greiner – drums, piano

Additional musicians
 Taylor Brandt – violin on "Float", "Generations", and "The Frost"
 Grant McFarland – producer, engineer, mixer, cello on "Generations", "Coordinates", "Dangerous", "Float", "The Frost" and "King of Sorrow"

Additional personnel
 Carson Slovak – producer, engineer, mixer
 Bob McCoy – assistant engineer
 Troy Glessner – mastering

Charts

References

2017 albums
August Burns Red albums
Fearless Records albums